Donald Ralph "Red" Huffman Sr. (May 13, 1915 – May 7, 1979) was the 12th head football coach at the Fort Hays State University in Hays, Kansas, serving for ten seasons, from 1946 to 1955, and compiling a record of 41–37–10.

Head coaching record

References

External links
 

1915 births
1979 deaths
American football centers
Fort Hays State Tigers football coaches
Fort Hays State Tigers football players
Kansas Jayhawks football coaches
People from Mitchell County, Kansas
Players of American football from Kansas